Dominic "The Dominator" Vea (born 2 April 1981 in Blacktown) is an Australian professional cruiser/heavyweight boxer of the 2000s and 2010s who won the Oriental and Pacific Boxing Federation (OPBF) cruiserweight title, World Boxing Organization (WBO) Oriental cruiserweight title, and Commonwealth cruiserweight title, and was a challenger for the Australian cruiserweight title against Daniel Ammann, his professional fighting weight varied from , i.e. cruiserweight to , i.e. heavyweight.

Professional boxing record

References

External links

Image - Dominic Vea
Image - Dominic Vea

1981 births
Boxers from Sydney
Cruiserweight boxers
Heavyweight boxers
Living people
Australian male boxers
Commonwealth Boxing Council champions